Wilhelm Imaging Research is an American company with expertise in the permanence of photographic and digital printing materials. It provides testing services and conservation advice.

It was started in 1995 by Henry Wilhelm and Carol Brower, who in 1993 had together written a book on photograph preservation, The Permanence and Care of Color Photographs: Traditional and Digital Color Prints, Color Negatives, Slides, and Motion Pictures.

References

External links
 Official website
 Fade to Black: article about criticism by Wilhelm Research of Kodak's longevity claims
 Going, Going, Gone! article about the controversies surrounding image permanence testing techniques

1995 establishments in the United States
Consulting firms established in 1995
Information technology consulting firms of the United States
Engineering consulting firms of the United States
Museum companies
Preservation (library and archival science)